

Events
Cleveland, Ohio sportsman Arthur B. "Mickey" McBride, the one time leader of the Mayfield Road Mob in Cleveland, purchases the Continental Press racing wire service from Moses Annenberg. 
The three year gang war between the Philadelphia crime family and the rival Lanzetti Brothers ends after the death of leader William Lanzetti. The remaining Lanzetti gang members leave the city soon after.
Chicago Outfit member Salvatore "Sam," "Mooney" Giancana is sentenced to three-years imprisonment.
After his arrest in 1937 for drug trafficking in New Orleans, Nicola Gentile flees the United States while out on bail.  He later returns to Sicily.
Vito Genovese leaves the United States, after being charged for the murder of Ferdinand Boccia, later arriving in Sicily. 
January 28 – Louis Cohen and Isadore Friedman, witnesses scheduled to testify against Louis "Lepke" Buchalter, are murdered in New York City. 
January 29 – George Weinberg, a numbers runner for Dutch Schultz, commits suicide while under police protection shortly before his scheduled testimony against Schultz.
April 28 – Abraham "Whitey" Friedman is murdered by Murder, Inc. gunmen, on orders of Louis Butchalter. 
May 10 – Tootsie Fienstein, a one time associate of Louis Buchalter, is murdered. 
May 25 – New York Teamsters Union President Morris Diamond, on orders of Louis Buchalter, is murdered by members of Murder, Inc.
Summer – Jack Dragna's gambling ships, in operation since Prohibition, are closed by the federal authorities.
August 24 – Louis Buchalter, leader of Murder, Inc., turns himself in to federal authorities, where he arranges a plea bargain with Walter Winchell. However, he is later indicted by New York District Attorney Thomas Dewey and extradited to New York where he is charged and later executed for murder.
September 6 – New York racketeer Irving "Puggy" Feinstein is murdered by members of Murder, Inc., including Abe Reles and Harry Maione, after being tied to a chair and burned to death.
October 20 – Charles Carrollo, head of the Kansas City crime syndicate, is convicted of violating federal tax laws and imprisoned in Leavenworth Federal Penitentiary in Leavenworth, Kansas. He is reportedly succeeded by Charles Binaggio.
November 16 – Due to ill health, Al Capone is granted an early released from Alcatraz, and committed to a hospital for treatment of paresis.

Arts and literature
Persons in Hiding, non-fiction book by J. Edgar Hoover.
Each Dawn I Die, film starring James Cagney and George Raft.
King of the Underworld, film starring Humphrey Bogart.
The Roaring Twenties, film featuring James Cagney and Humphrey Bogart.
You Can't Get Away with Murder, film starring Humphrey Bogart.

Births
Pietro Alfano, drug trafficker and nephew-in-law to Gaetano Badalamenti
Louis DeSorbo "Big Louie", associate of the Genovese crime family
Peter Gotti "One Eyed Pete", member and one time acting boss of the Gambino crime family
Gennaro Langella "Jerry Lang", Colombo crime family, acting boss
Joseph Ligambi "Uncle Joe", Philadelphia crime family, boss
Joseph D. Pistone "Donnie Brasco", undercover FBI infiltrator of the Bonanno crime family
April 23 – Stefano Bontade "The Prince", Palermo mafia boss

Deaths
Walter Stevens, Chicago gangster involved in labor slugging 
January 28 – Louis Cohen, government witness  
January 28 – Isadore Friedman, government witness 
January 29 – George Weinberg, government informant and former associate of Dutch Schultz
April 28 – Abraham "Whitey" Friedman, Murder, Inc. victim 
May 10 – Tootsie Fienstein, associate of Louis Buchalter
May 25 – Morris Diamond, New York Teamsters Union President
September 6 – Irving Feinstein "Puggy", New York racketeer

Years in organized crime
Organized crime